Great Western Bridge may refer to:
Kelvinbridge in Glasgow, Scotland
the 1927 bridge replaced in the 1970s by the Joy Baluch AM Bridge across the head of Spencer Gulf in South Australia